The Russian Opposition Coordination Council (OCC or KSO; , КСО – Koordinatsionnyy sovet rossiyskoy oppozitsii, KSO) was a council created in October 2012 by Russian protesters. Due to the fractured nature of the opposition, in June 2012 activists decided to create a 45-member Opposition Coordination Council (OCC), which would try to coordinate and direct dissent in Russia.

Elections for the council were held on 20–22 October 2012. 170,000 people had registered on the site cvk2012.org, of whom nearly 98,000 were classed as "verified" and nearly 82,000 had cast their votes. The council was dissolved in October 2013.

Members by votes
Most votes were cast for Alexei Navalny.

Civil activists list 
Alexei Navalny
Dmitry Bykov
Garry Kasparov
Kseniya Sobchak
Ilya Yashin
Mikhail Gelfand
Yevgeniya Chirikova
Mikhail Shats
Vladimir Ashurkov
Dmitry Gudkov
Tatyana Lazareva
Sergey Parkhomenko
Filipp Dzyadko
Gennady Gudkov
Lyubov Sobol
Boris Nemtsov
Olga Romanova
Oleg Kashin
Andrey Illarionov
Sergei Udaltsov
Vladimir Vladimirovich Kara-Murza
Rustem Adagamov
Aleksandr Ivanovich Vinokurov
Maxim Katz
Suren Gazaryan
Georgy Alburov
Andrey Piontkovsky
Vladimir Mirzoyev
Oleg Shein
Vladislav Naganov

Left politicians list 
Alexey Gaskarov
Ekaterina Aitova
Aleksandr Nikolaev
Akim Palachev
Leonid Razvozzhayev

Liberal politicians list 
Sergey Davidis
Andrey Pivovarov
Anton Dolgikh
Anna Karetnikova
Pyotr Tsarkov

Nationalist politicians list 
Daniil Konstantinov
Ogor Artemov
Nikolay Bondarik
Konstantin Krylov
Vladimir Tor

See also
Russian opposition
2011–13 Russian protests

References

External links
Russian Opposition Coordination Council This link takes one to Umbrella Insurance.

2011–2013 Russian protests
2012 establishments in Russia
2013 disestablishments in Russia
Defunct organizations based in Russia
Liberalism in Russia
Opposition to Vladimir Putin
Political organizations based in Russia
Russian democracy movements